Jan Vacek won in the final 2–6, 7–6(7–2), 6–3 against Fernando Meligeni.

Seeds

  Gustavo Kuerten (first round)
  Guillermo Cañas (quarterfinals)
  Vladimir Voltchkov (first round)
  Nicolás Massú (second round)
  Fernando Meligeni (final)
  Alexandre Simoni (semifinals)
  Agustín Calleri (semifinals)
  Mariano Zabaleta (second round)

Draw

Finals

Top half

Bottom half

References
 2001 Brasil Open Draw

Singles
Men's Singles